Ponikve is a small settlement to the east of Begunje in the Municipality of Cerknica in the Inner Carniola region of Slovenia.

Name
The name Ponikve is a plural form derived from the word ponikva 'influent stream' or 'sinkhole' (into which such a stream disappears). In its plural form it refers to a gently rolling landscape consisting of the basins of an influent stream. Like other villages named Ponikve and similar names (e.g., Ponikva), it refers to a local landscape element.

References

External links

Ponikve on Geopedia

Populated places in the Municipality of Cerknica